Scott P. Moore (born February 1960), is a retired Rear Admiral of the United States Navy. Moore is a former member of SEAL Team TWO and previously served as commanding officer of the Naval Special Warfare Development Group from 2007 to 2009. He is an Admiral Circle member for the exhibit SEAL: The Unspoken Sacrifice.  He is active in the Navy SEAL Foundation.

Early life
Moore was born in Palo Alto, California and grew up in Colorado Springs, Colorado. He is the son of U.S. Air Force Major Thomas D. Moore, Jr - KIA Vietnam, November, 1967.

Naval career
Scott P. Moore graduated from the United States Air Force Academy in 1983 with a bachelor's of science degree and received an inter service commission as an Ensign in the United States Navy. Moore then received orders to Basic Underwater Demolition/SEAL training (BUD/S) at Naval Amphibious Base Coronado. After six months of training, Moore graduated with BUD/S Class 126 in February 1984. His first operational assignment was with SEAL Team THREE. Following SEAL Tactical Training (STT) and completion of six month probationary period, he received the 1130 designator as a Naval Special Warfare Officer, entitled to wear the Special Warfare insignia. Moore later transferred to SEAL Team TWO as platoon commander. In 1990, Moore volunteered for assignment to Naval Special Warfare Development Group (commonly known as SEAL TEAM SIX or NSWDG) at Dam Neck, Virginia and completed a specialized selection and training course. Moore served as element leader and assault team leader at NSWDG till 1994, during which time he planned, rehearsed and operated during classified exercises and operations. His operational experience in leading SEAL teams included over 2000 missions, Just Cause, Desert Storm, Bosnia, Mogadishu, Global War on Terror, and Haiti. His staff and command assignments include executive officer, NSWU 2 from July 1996 to February 1998; current operations officer, NSWDG and commanding officer, SEAL Team TWO from 2000 to 2002. Moore later earned a Master of Arts degree in National Security Affairs from the Naval War College in November 2003. Moore was promoted to Navy Captain in August 2005. Moore served as deputy commander and unit commander of Naval Special Warfare Development Group (DEVGRU) from 2005 to 2009. Moore was promoted to Navy Rear Admiral in 2010. His final assignment before retirement was deputy commander, Naval Special Warfare Command from 2012 to 2014.

Military positions held
 Assistant Platoon Commander, SEAL Team THREE
 Platoon Commander, SEAL Team TWO
 Team Leader, Naval Special Warfare Development Group
 Joint Special Operations Task Force
 Executive Officer, Naval Special Warfare Unit TWO 
 SEAL officer detailer, NAVPERSCOM
 Special Operations Command Europe (SOCEUR); maritime operations officer
 Commanding Officer, SEAL Team TWO
 Counter Terrorism Division; director
 Executive Office of the President, Director of Counterterrorism, National Security Council Staff 
 Special Operations and Counterterrorism, Joint Staff J-37; deputy director
 Office of the Defense Representative; deputy for operations
 Operation Officer, Deputy Commander, Commanding Officer, Naval Special Warfare Development Group
 Deputy Commander, Naval Special Warfare Command;

Awards and decorations

References

Living people
Recipients of the Defense Superior Service Medal
United States Air Force Academy alumni
SEAL Team Six personnel
United States Navy admirals
Naval War College alumni
Recipients of the Legion of Merit
1960 births